Lough Inagh is a freshwater lake in the Inagh Valley, in Connemara, Galway, in the west of Ireland.

Geography
The Twelve Bens range lies to the west of the lake, with Derryclare  and Bencorr  directly overlooking the lake. The bulk of the Maumturks range and its long central spine lies to the east of the lake, with two highest peaks of Letterbreckaun  and Binn idir an Dá Log , also overlooking the Lough.

Lough Inagh is fed from several mountain streams in the area, but most importantly from the Gleninagh River that starts high up in the Gleninagh Valley on the slopes of Benbaun and Bencollaghduff, and the Tooreennacoona River. After flowing into Lough Inagh, the river flows into Derryclare Lough, and then into Ballynahinch Lake, where it eventually joins the Owenmore River where is flows into Bertraghboy Bay.

Fishing
Lough Inagh is noted for its lake and river fishing with spring salmon, grilse and sea trout (depending on season), and the fishing is mostly done from boats, however, the lake is too big for rowing and an outboard motor is recommended (there are a couple of submerged rocks so caution should be taken).

The Lough and its fishing rights are privately owned and controlled by local fishing lodges in the Inagh Valley.  Irish fishing author, Peter O'Reilly, said about Lough Inagh that "This lough will take more than one day to explore adequately, for it can be one of the best".

Scenic location
The lake is a popular scenic location and to the west, gives views directly into the large deep southerly corrie between Derryclare and Bencorr (meaning "wood of the big corrie"), as well as the smaller corrie between Bencorr and Bencorr North Top (meaning "wood of the small corrie").    It also looks into the Derryclare Wood and Derryclare Nature Reserve, which lie at the base of the two corries as they meet the Lough.

Gallery

Bibliography

See also

Derryclare Lough
Twelve Bens
Mweelrea, major range in Killary Harbour
Maumturks, major range in Connemara
Lists of mountains in Ireland
List of loughs in Ireland

References

Inagh
Connemara